"24/7" is a song performed by American contemporary R&B singer Kevon Edmonds, issued as the first single from his debut studio album of the same name. The song is his only hit to date on the Billboard Hot 100, peaking at #10 on the chart in 1999.

The song was certified gold by the RIAA on January 10, 2000.

Music video

The official music video for "24/7" was directed by David Nelson.

Chart positions

Weekly charts

Year-end charts

References

External links
 
 

1999 songs
1999 debut singles
Kevon Edmonds songs
RCA Records singles
Contemporary R&B ballads
1990s ballads